View-Master is the trademark name of a line of special-format stereoscopes and corresponding View-Master "reels", which are thin cardboard disks containing seven Stereoscopic 3-D pairs of small transparent color photographs on film.  It was originally manufactured and sold by Sawyer's.

The View-Master system was introduced in 1939, four years after the advent of Kodachrome color film made the use of small, high-quality photographic color images practical. Tourist attraction and travel views predominated in View-Master's early lists of reels, most of which were meant to be of interest to users of all ages. Most current View-Master reels are intended for children.

History

1919–1956: early photo services

Edwin Eugene Mayer worked as a pharmacist at Owl Drug store in downtown Portland, Oregon, after serving in the U.S. Army in World War I.  He built up a photo-finishing business there, and bought into Sawyer's Photo Finishing Service in 1919 with the help of his father August Mayer, his fiancée Eva McAnulty, and her sister Vi McAnulty.

Edwin described how he started the business in a letter dated April 1, 1954: "Suffice to say that in 1919, what little it was, was purchased with borrowed ($3,500) money from Dad, aided by about $1,600 in insurance money Eva got when her father died and which was left in permanently, and $1,600 borrowed from Vi and repaid, along with Dad's notes, within a few years."

As the business grew, Ed Mayer incorporated in about 1926, taking on partners Harold and Beulth F. Graves, Thomas and Pauline Meyer, and Augusta and Raymond F. Kelly, renaming the business Sawyer Service, Inc. The company relocated to a large two-story building at 181 Ella St., near Morrison Street in Portland, Oregon.

The company was producing photographic postcards and album sets as souvenirs by 1926, when Harold Graves joined Sawyer's. Graves handled marketing for the products while Mayer ran the business. Later, photographic greeting cards were added to the Sawyer's product line, marketed to major department stores. Sawyer's was the nation's largest producer of scenic postcards in the 1920s and the future View-Master viewer eventually became an extension of the two-dimensional cards.

The company took the first steps towards developing the View-Master after Edwin Mayer and Graves met with William Gruber, an organ maker of German origin trained by Welte & Sons and an avid photographer living in Portland. Mayer and Gruber had both developed devices for viewing stereo images, but Gruber had made up a stereo imaging rig out of two Kodak Bantam Specials mounted together on a tripod. He designed a machine that mounted the tiny pieces of Kodachrome color transparency film into reels made from heavy paper stock. A special viewer was also designed and produced. He had the idea of updating the old-fashioned stereoscope by using the new Kodachrome 16-mm color film, which had recently become available.

New business venture

A View-Master reel holds 14 film transparencies in seven pairs, making up the seven stereoscopic images. The components of each pair are viewed simultaneously, one by each eye, thus simulating binocular depth perception.

According to a 1960 court document, the Gruber-Sawyer partner venture began from that first meeting in 1938. Thereafter, Ed Mayer negotiated with Gruber while production methods and some marketing were developed. After three years, a formal agreement was entered into on February 24, 1942, between Gruber and Sawyer partners, doing business as Sawyer's.

Ed Mayer and people within the Sawyer's organization were uncertain what to call their new product, but they eventually came up with the name "View-Master". The View-Master brand name eventually came to be recognized by 65 percent of the world's population, but William Gruber disliked the name which Mayer gave it, thinking that it sounded too much like Toast-Master, Mix-Master, or some other kitchen appliance.

The View-Master was introduced at the 1939 New York World's Fair, marked "Patent Applied For". It was intended as an alternative to the scenic postcard, and was originally sold at photography shops, stationery stores, and scenic-attraction gift shops. The main subjects of View-Master reels were Carlsbad Caverns and the Grand Canyon.

The View-Master was marketed through Ed Mayer's photo-finishing, postcard, and greeting card company Sawyer's Service, Inc., known eventually as Sawyer's, Inc. The partnership led to the retail sales of View-Master viewers and reels. The patent on the viewing device was issued in 1940, on what came to be called the Model A viewer. Within a very short time, the View-Master took over the postcard business at Sawyer's.

Expansion
Ed Mayer gave details of the company's expansion in a letter dated April 1, 1954:

In 1939, 20 years after starting the business, we had, by dint of hard work and long hours and frugal living, accumulated a business (Sawyer's) worth about $58,000.00 and Western Photo Supply Co. owning the buildings, worth about $30,000.00. The above figures were for the total business and buildings owned by the Kellys, Graves, Mayers and Meyers. In 1946, we had already grown a lot from 1939, and Sawyer's made a lease with Western Photo Supply Co., they to build and lease two new buildings to Sawyer's, in addition to the two we already had. At this point, Sawyer's also decided to change its structure from a partnership to a corporation, for various good reasons, one of which was to permit our children to participate in the stock ownership.

In the 1940s, the United States military recognized the potential for using View-Master products for personnel training, purchasing 100,000 viewers and nearly six million reels from 1942 to the end of World War II in 1945.

After the development of the View-Master, Sawyer's, Inc. moved into a new building at 735 S.W. 20th Place in downtown Portland. The company also occupied a building next door at 740 S.W. 21st Avenue. Years later, Edwin Mayer and his Sawyer's partners purchased land in Washington County near Progress, Oregon, west of Beaverton, and built a large plant there in about 1951. The plant has since been removed and developed into a shopping center. After moving to the new plant, Mayer leased the old Sawyer's building on 20th Place to Oregon Television, Inc., KPTV, Channel 12.

1950s
In 1951, Sawyer's purchased Tru-Vue, the main competitor of View-Master. The takeover eliminated the main rival and also gained Tru-Vue's licensing rights to Walt Disney Studios. Sawyer's capitalized on the opportunity and produced numerous reels featuring Disney characters. The takeover paid off further in 1955 with reels of the newly opened Disneyland.
 Joe Liptak was the artist responsible for most of the Disney and the early Hanna-Barbera reels.

In 1952, Sawyer's began its View-Master Personal line, which included the View-Master Personal Stereo Camera for users to make their own View-Master reels. It was successful at first, but the line was discontinued in ten years. This line spawned the Model D viewer, View-Master's highest-quality viewer, which was available until the early 1970s, and the Stereomatic 500, View-Master's only 3D projector. The other projectors were 2D and used only one of the images.

The Model E was introduced in 1955 with a more modern design, big ivory buttons on the picture changer levers, and a large "V" slot on top for easier reel insertion. It was released in brown and black in the United States, and some other colors elsewhere. It was about 4 inches high, 5 inches wide, and 4 inches deep.

The Model F was introduced in 1958. It used C-cell batteries to power an internal lighting source. Industrial designer Charles "Chuck" Harrison led the team designing the Model F View-Master. Fifty years later in 2008, Harrison won the Cooper-Hewitt Lifetime Achievement Award.

1962–present: stereoscopic toy
In 1962, the Bakelite models were replaced with lighter plastic versions, the first of which was the Model G. This change was driven by Sawyer's new president, Bob Brost, who took over in 1959. The View-Master had been constructed originally from Kodak Tenite plastic and then Bakelite, a hard, sturdy, somewhat heavy plastic. The lightweight thermoplastic became the material of choice under Brost.

In 1966, Sawyer's was acquired by the General Aniline & Film (GAF) Corporation, and became a wholly owned subsidiary. Under GAF's ownership, View-Master reels began to feature fewer scenic and more child-friendly subjects, such as toys and cartoons. Television series were featured on View-Master reels, such as Doctor Who (sold only in the U.K.), Rowan & Martin's Laugh-In, Star Trek, The Man from U.N.C.L.E., Family Affair, Here's Lucy, and The Beverly Hillbillies. Actor Henry Fonda appeared in a series of TV commercials for the GAF View-Master.

From 1970 to around 1997, there were versions of Talking View-Masters, which included audio technology with the reels with three major designs with increasing sophistication. In the early 1970s, GAF introduced the View-Master Rear Screen Projector, a table-top projector that displayed images from picture wheels.

In 1980, View-Master released the Show Beam Projector, a toy that combined the company's stereoscopic images and flashlight technology to produce a portable hand-held projector. The Show Beam used small film cartridges that were plugged into the side of the toy. Each cartridge contained 30 full-color 2D images.

In 1981, GAF sold View-Master to a group of investors headed by Arnold Thaler, and the company was reconstituted as the View-Master International Group.

In 1985, View-Master entered into the video foray, by starting View-Master Video and teamed up with Warner Bros. Records on a new live-action educational video series produced by Together Again Productions, Kidsongs, designed specifically for the educational market.

View-Master International acquired the Ideal Toy Company in 1984 and became known as the View-Master Ideal Group; View-Master Ideal in turn was purchased by Tyco Toys in 1989.

Tyco, including the View-Master Ideal Group, merged with Mattel Inc. in 1997. View-Master was placed organizationally in Mattel's pre-school division and is now marketed under the Fisher-Price imprint, who continues emphasis on juvenile content.

In 1998, during the purchase of the Tyco Toys-owned plant by Mattel, EPA investigations began on the View-Master factory supply well for the toxic chemical trichloroethylene (TCE).  The plant was shut down in 2001.

In March 2009, the Fisher-Price division of toy maker Mattel announced that they had stopped production in December 2008 of the scenic reels depicting tourist attractions. These reels of picturesque scenes and landscape scenery were descendants of the first View-Master reels sold in 1939. Fisher-Price announced they would continue to produce reels of animated characters. In late 2009, Alpha-cine announced it would take up scenic reel production under an agreement with Fisher-Price.

2015–2019: Virtual reality

In February 2015, Mattel announced a collaboration with Google to produce a new version of View-Master called the View-Master Virtual Reality Viewer, based on virtual reality using smartphones. The new View-Master is an implementation of the Google Cardboard VR platform, and is accompanied by a mobile app that was built using its SDK. Content is displayed on a smartphone screen; the phone itself is inserted into the back of the unit. Instead of being inserted directly into the View-Master, reels are scanned using an augmented reality interface which enables access to content from the reel, such as 360-degree panoramas, 3D models, and minigames.

Greenbot considered the View-Master to be the best low-cost Cardboard viewer, citing its build quality and comfort over models actually constructed from cardboard, but noting that the latch mechanism for securing the phone inside was not tight enough, and that there was no headphone jack access. It was felt that the View-Master VR was "the kind of thing you might grab as a gift for the kids, but if you're curious about VR on your phone, chances are you'll use it as much as they do."

In 2016, an updated iteration known as the DLX was released; it features improvements to its compatibility with smaller phones, a more secure latch for the phone compartment, and also adds focal adjustment and a headphone port.

Both editions of the View-Master VR were discontinued in November 2019, and the Experience packs can no longer be installed by new users.

In 2019, Mattel partnered with MGM to announce an upcoming feature film based on the View-Master. The project will be co-piloted by Robbie Brenner of Mattel's Films division and MGM's Cassidy Lange.

Cumulative production
There have been some 25 viewer models, thousands of titles, and 1.5 billion reels produced. The basic design remained intact for reels and internal mechanisms, despite its long history and many changes in models and materials, ensuring that every reel will work in every model.

Recognition
In 1999, View-Master was part of the second year of inductees added to the National Toy Hall of Fame.

Notable uses

Reels have been produced for Disneyland, many TV shows (such as The Flying Nun, Lost in Space, and The Munsters), blockbuster movies (such as The Poseidon Adventure, E.T. the Extra-Terrestrial, and Jurassic Park), and the U.S. military (for airplane and ship identification as well as range estimation).

David L. Bassett, an expert on anatomy and dissection, collaborated with Gruber to create a 25-volume atlas of human anatomy using the View-Master system.

View-Master produced custom reels for commercial customers to show 3-D images of products and services to potential clients. For example, in the early 1990s, Canadian restaurant chain East Side Mario's used a View-Master reel as their dessert menu.

Among the newest View-Master products are a Discovery Channel View-Master, the new Virtual Viewer, the Discovery Channel View-Master Projector and Telescope, and the View-Master 3-D Pocket Viewer, which feature images of popular performers in concert and backstage.

See also
 Slide viewer
 Virtual reality
 Google Cardboard

References

External links

1940s toys
Products introduced in 1939
Fisher-Price
Mattel
Photography equipment
Stereoscopic photography
Optical toys